Milad Sheykhi Soleimani (born 9 February 1992) is an Iranian football defender. He currently plays for Shams Azar F.C..

Club career

Club career statistics
Last Update: 1 August 2014 

 Assist goals

Honours

Dhaka Abahani
 Independence Cup: 2021–22
 Federation Cup: 2021–22

References

External links
 Milad Sheikh Soleimani at PersianLeague

Living people
1992 births
Iranian footballers
People from Izeh
Association football defenders
Sepidrood Rasht players
Fajr Sepasi players
Naft Masjed Soleyman F.C. players
Abahani Limited (Dhaka) players
Bangladesh Football Premier League players
Sportspeople from Khuzestan province